Destiny was a monthly high-end business, lifestyle and fashion magazine for women. It was published in South Africa by Ndalo Media before the publishing company was shut down in January 2019.

History
Ndalo Media was a pioneering print and digital media company that owned and published Destiny and Destiny Man magazines. It was founded by Khanyi Dhlomo in partnership with Media24 (under Naspers) and published the first issue of Destiny in October 2007. The magazine ran until January 2019 when Dhlomo shut Ndalo Media down amidst claims of financial distress.

Target audience
Destiny was aimed at women who either aspired to be or were actively engaged in business and who were 25–55 years old. The magazine combined business news (South African and global) with fashion, beauty, lifestyle, entertainment, health, travel and inspirational content.

Destiny Man
Destiny Man was an alternate-monthly publication aimed at accomplished, stylish, affluent and self-assured South African men. It was the brother publication to Destiny of which first issue appeared in July 2009, followed by its online extension in the same month.

See also
Khanyi Dhlomo
Kojo Baffoe

References

External links
 Launch press release

2007 establishments in South Africa
Business magazines
English-language magazines published in South Africa
Magazines established in 2007
Magazines published in South Africa
Monthly magazines published in South Africa
Women's magazines
History of women in South Africa